Raimangal River is a tidal estuarine river in and around the Sundarbans in South 24 Parganas district in the Indian state of West Bengal and Satkhira District in Bangladesh.

The Ichamati breaks up into several distributaries below Hingalganj the chief of which are the Raimangal, Bidya, Jhilla, Kalindi and Jamuna. These fan out into wide estuaries in the Sundarbans. It forms the international boundary between India and Bangladesh for some distance.

References

Sundarbans
International rivers of Asia
Rivers of West Bengal
Rivers of Bangladesh
Geography of South 24 Parganas district
Satkhira District
Rivers of India
Rivers of Khulna Division